"Stoned Soul Picnic" is a 1968 song by Laura Nyro. The best-known version of the song was recorded by The 5th Dimension, and was the first single released from their album of the same title. It was the most successful single from that album, reaching No. 3 on the U.S. Pop chart and No. 2 on the Billboard R&B chart. It became a platinum record.

The song was composed and recorded by Nyro for her album Eli and the Thirteenth Confession, released in March 1968. According to Marilyn McCoo, it was producer Bones Howe who suggested that it would be a good song for the 5th Dimension to cover. The group would go on to record several more hits with Nyro songs, including "Sweet Blindness", "Wedding Bell Blues", "Blowin' Away", and "Save the Country".

An instrumental version was recorded by jazz vibraphonist Roy Ayers and became the title track to his 1968 album.

The word surry, used frequently in the lyric (e.g. "Surry down to a stoned soul picnic"), is a neologism by Nyro; its meaning is unclear.  The verb surry is spelled differently from the noun surrey (an old-time carriage).  When asked by producer Charlie Calello what the word meant, Nyro told him, "Oh, it's just a nice word." One possible meaning is that surry is a shortening of "let's hurry."

Personnel
Billy Davis Jr. 
Florence LaRue 
Marilyn McCoo  
Lamonte McLemore 
Ron Townson

Additional personnel

Mike Deasy – electric guitar
Joe Osborn – bass
Hal Blaine – drums, percussion
Larry Bunker – percussion
Larry Knechtel – piano
Jimmy Rowles – organ
The Sid Sharp Strings – string section
The Bill Holman Brass – horn section

Chart history

Weekly charts

Year-end charts

Sampling and covers
Crystal Waters sampled the song on her single "Ghetto Day" from her 1994 album Storyteller. The British pop group Swing Out Sister included it on their 1997 album, Shapes and Patterns. Afro-Celtic artist Laura Love recorded the song in 2000 for her album 'Fourteen Days.' It was also recorded by Julie London on her 1969 album Yummy, Yummy, Yummy; and by the New York Voices on their 2007 album A Day Like This. It also appeared on the 2004 album Don't Talk, recorded by British jazz singer Claire Teal. Singer-Songwriter Jill Sobule recorded it for release as a single in 2001. It also appears on the Billy Childs album Map to the Treasure: Reimagining Laura Nyro sung by Ledisi.

Chicano Batman has a song with the same title on their 2014 album Cycles Of Existential Rhyme.

References

External links
 

1968 singles
Laura Nyro songs
The 5th Dimension songs
Songs written by Laura Nyro
Psychedelic soul songs
1968 songs
Song recordings produced by Bones Howe